Kende Fodor (born 4 November 1976) is a Hungarian fencer. He competed in the team sabre event at the 2004 Summer Olympics.

References

External links
 

1976 births
Living people
Hungarian male sabre fencers
Olympic fencers of Hungary
Fencers at the 2004 Summer Olympics
Martial artists from Budapest